Junagadh was a princely state of the British Raj, located in what is now the Indian state of Gujarat.  It was under the suzerainty of the British Raj, but not part of directly-ruled British India.

At the independence and partition of British India of 1947, the 562 princely states were given a choice to either join the new Dominion of India or the newly formed state of Pakistan.

The Nawab of Junagadh, Muhammad Mahabat Khanji III, a Muslim whose ancestors had ruled Junagadh and small principalities for some two hundred years, decided that Junagadh should become part of Pakistan, much to the displeasure of many of the people of the state, an overwhelming majority of whom were Hindus, about 80%. The Nawab acceded to the Dominion of Pakistan on 15 August 1947, against the advice of Lord Mountbatten, arguing that Junagadh joined Pakistan by sea. The principality of Babariawad and Sheikh of Mangrol reacted by claiming independence from Junagadh and accession to India, although the Sheikh of Mangrol withdrew his accession to India the very next day. Muhammad Ali Jinnah waited for a month to accept the Instrument of Accession. When Pakistan accepted the Nawab's Instrument of Accession on 16 September, the Government of India was outraged that Jinnah could accept the accession of Junagadh despite his argument that Hindus and Muslims could not live as one nation. Home minister Vallabhbhai Patel believed that if Junagadh was permitted to go to Pakistan, it would exacerbate the communal tension already simmering in Gujarat.

The princely state was surrounded on all of its land borders by India, with an outlet onto the Arabian Sea. The unsettled conditions in Junagadh had led to a cessation of all trade with India and the food position became precarious. With the region in crisis, the Nawab, fearing for his life, felt forced to flee to Karachi with his family and his followers, and there he established a provisional government.

Vallabhbhai Patel offered Pakistan time to reverse its acceptance of the accession and to hold a plebiscite in Junagadh. Meanwhile, tensions were simmering in the regional areas and in major cities such as Bombay against Nawab's decision. 25,000 - 30,000 people belonging to Saurashtra and Junagadh gathered in Bombay, proclaiming to "liberate" Junagadh from the Nawab's regime. Samaldas Gandhi formed a government-in-exile, the Aarzi Hukumat (lit. Temporary government) of the people of Junagadh. Eventually, Patel ordered the forcible annexation of Junagadh's three principalities. Junagadh's state government, facing financial collapse and lacking forces with which to resist Indian force, invited the Government of India to take control. A plebiscite was conducted in December, in which approximately 99.95% of the people chose India over Pakistan.

Scholars have observed that India annexed Junagadh through force with scholars viewing the annexation as part of a wider programme by the Indian state of getting the rulers of princely states to accede into a unified post colonial India.

Background
After the announcement by the last Viceroy of India, Lord Mountbatten, on 3 June 1947, of the intention to partition British India, the British parliament passed the Indian Independence Act 1947 on 18 July 1947. As a result, the native states were left with these choices: to accede to either of the two new dominions, India or Pakistan or to remain an independent state.

The constitutional adviser to the Nawab of Junagadh, Nabi Baksh, and Junagadh's ministers gave the impression to Mountbatten that Junagadh intended to accede to India. However, Muslim League politicians from Sindh had joined Junagadh's executive council since May, and the state's diwan was away for health reasons, leaving the charge with Shah Nawaz Bhutto. Bhutto met Jinnah in July, who advised him to hold out till 15 August under any circumstances. Accordingly, the state continued to give the impression till the last moment that it was intending to join India along with other Kathiawar states.
Four days before independence, under the influence of the Muslim League politicians, the Nawab decided to join Pakistan, and sent a delegation to Karachi to negotiate terms with Pakistan, disregarding Mountbatten's contiguity principle. Mountbatten's contention was that only states bordering Pakistan should accede to it. Evidently, it was not a constitutional requirement, only a political one. The Nawab and Pakistan reasoned that Junagadh was close enough to Pakistan and linked by a sea route (Veraval to Karachi).

Junagadh, under the amendments done to the Government of India Act 1935, had political bonds with the neighboring states of Mangrol and Babariawad. In 1943, The latter states were tied to Junagadh through an attachment scheme, but when the act was adopted in 1947, the amendments had not carried over, and this lapse was the base on which VP Menon argued that Junagadh did not have a say in the affairs of Mangrol and Babariawad states. Nehru strategised that if Junagadh didn't recognize the accession of Mangrol and Babariawad and withdraw its forces from the latter, then he would send in forces, information of which he sent to Pakistan and Britain. Meanwhile, a study case of India regarding Junagadh was made in the international opinion through press communiques that provided information on Junagadh's geographical contiguity to Indian landscape and its demographics.

Instrument of accession

Mountbatten and Ayyangar both agreed that the issue of geographical contiguity had no legal standing and that Junagadh's accession to Pakistan was strictly and legally correct. But Sardar Patel demanded that the matter of the state's accession should be decided by its people instead of the ruler. Nehru laid out India's position which was that India did not accept Junagadh's accession to Pakistan.

Later at the United Nations Security Council, India's argument revolved around the wishes of the people which it accused the Nawab of ignoring. India's representative at the UNSC was also advised to avoid legalistic arguments about the Instrument of Accession because of the effect it could have on Kashmir.

Provisional government (Aarzee Hukumat)
Upon Menon's advice Mahatma Gandhi's nephew, Samaldas Gandhi, created a provisional government in Bombay with the provincial government's backing. This government received support from the 'Gujarat States Organisation' and also received sponsorship from the Kathiawar States' Political Conference.

Samaldas Gandhi, U. N. Dhebar and members of Junagadh People's Conference met at the office of Gujarati daily Vande Mataram in Bombay on 19 August 1947. He was specially invited to attend Kathiawar Political Conference on 25 August 1947. A five-member committee called Junagadh Committee was formed on 15 September 1947. Gandhi met V. P. Menon and proposed to form a government-in-exile the Aarzi Hakumat or Provisional Government of Junagadh State. On 25 September 1947, the Aarzi Hukumat headed by Samaldas Gandhi was declared in a public meeting at Madhavbagh in Bombay.

The five member ministry of Aarzi Hakumat went to Rajkot. Gandhi became the Prime Minister and also held ministry of foreign affairs.  Aarzi Hakumat captured 160 villages in forty days, from 30 September to 8 November 1947.

India allowed the provisional government to take control over outlying areas of Junagadh. India later at the UN Security Council denied ever having supported the provisional government. Pakistan objected to India's indifference to the actions of Junagadh's provisional government. Nehru wrote to Pakistan that the provisional government was "a spontaneous expression of popular resentment" to the state's accession to Pakistan by Junagadh's local population.

Blockade and Indian annexation
To force the Nawab of Junagadh to change his decision, the Provisional Government (Aarzee Hukumat) and the volunteer forces in the surrounding regions of Kathiawar implemented a blockade. India later denied ever having blocked Junagadh's supplies. The blockade compelled the state's ruler to leave for Pakistan, who left the state's administration to Sir Shahnawaz Bhutto. Menon claimed that the Nawab had delegated the state's destiny to Bhutto, which is not implausible since it was primarily Shah Nawaz Bhutto who had taken the decision to accede to Pakistan, under the close influence and mentorship of Jinnah. Bhutto requested the regional commissioner for administrative assistance "pending an honourable settlement of the several issues involved in Junagadh's accession." Diwan Bhutto waited till November for Pakistan to send help, but none came. The provisional government, nationalistic volunteers from the Indian side, and the Hindu residents had started to agitate and tensions were simmering. Meanwhile, the state of Junagadh had raised a force of 670 Muslim men, who had been stationed at various places to ensure retaliation, if any. Fearing an outbreak of communal violence, on 9 November 1947, the Indian Government assumed the state's administration to re-establish peace. Nawab's soldiers were disarmed, with Diwan Bhutto leaving for Pakistan a day before.

Nehru telegrammed Liaquat Ali Khan:

Liaquat Ali Khan replied:

Reports arrived of widespread murder, rape and looting of Muslims in Junagarh following the arrival of Indian troops. Many Muslims from Junagarh began migrating to Pakistan.

After India assumed administration in Junagadh, India's Ministry of Law stated that the accession of Junagadh to Pakistan had not been invalidated by plebiscite and that Junagadh had not yet acceded to India. But India went ahead with the referendum because it believed the result would be in its favour.

Plebiscite
On 24 September, legal adviser Walter Monckton told Mountbatten that Pakistan's consent would be needed for any plebiscite India wished to conduct in Junagadh because of the Nawab's accession to Pakistan.

Nehru had shifted from his earlier position of allowing a plebiscite under the UN and now said that it was unnecessary for a plebiscite to be held under the UN though it could send one or two observers if it wished to do so. However, India also made it clear that it would not under any circumstances postpone the plebiscite so as to allow the UN or Pakistan to send observers. A plebiscite was held on 20 February 1948, in which all but 91 out of 190,870 who voted (from an electorate of 201,457) voted to join India, i.e. 99.95% of the population voted to join India.

Douglas Brown of the Daily Telegraph as well as Pakistani newspaper Dawn expressed concerns about the propriety of the plebiscite's arrangement. On 26 February, Pakistan termed India's proceeding with the plebiscite a 'discourtesy to Pakistan and the Security Council'. In the plebiscite India polled 222,184 votes and Pakistan 130 out of a total population of 720,000 of Junagadh and its feudatories.

Only 15 percent (21,606) of Junagadh's Muslim population voted while 30 percent (179,851) of the non-Muslim population voted. The total number of voters on electoral rolls was 200, 569 and less than 10,000 Muslims voted for India. In Manvadar, 276 out of 520 Muslims voted for India, in Bantwa 19 out of 39 and 79 out of 231 in Sardargarh. In Bantwa and Babariawad the number of voters who cast their votes in India's favour was less than the number of non-Muslim voters there, which meant that even some non-Muslims did not vote for India. According to scholar Rakesh Ankit, India took liberties with facts and laws as it acted as the "judge, jury and executioner" of the entire situation.

Later arrangements
After six months administration by Government of India, three civilian members (Samaldas Gandhi, Dayashankar Dave and Pushpaben Mehta) were inducted for the administration of Junagadh on 1 June 1948. The election of the seven constituencies of the Junagadh region for the Constitution Assembly of Saurashtra was declared in December 1948.  All seven members of Indian National Congress were elected unopposed and they all voted to merge Junagadh State with Saurashtra State. The merger was completed in January 1949.

On 1 November 1956, Saurashtra State was merged with Bombay State. Bombay State was split into the linguistic states of Gujarat and Maharashtra in 1960, and Junagadh district is now one of the districts of Gujarat.

Pakistan brought the case of Junagadh to the United Nations in January 1948. The UN Security Council commanded its commission on Kashmir to examine the conflict over Junagadh. The Kashmir conflict eclipsed the matter of Junagadh at the United Nations Security Council, where Junagadh's case is still unresolved. Pakistan's official maps show Junagadh, Manavadar and Sir Creek as Pakistani territory.

See also
 Instrument of Accession (Jammu and Kashmir)
 Bantva Manavadar
 Pathans of Gujarat

Notes

References

Bibliography

Further reading
 
 

Partition of India
Political integration of India
Junagadh
1948 in India
Military history of the princely states of India
Nehru administration
States and territories disestablished in 1948
Annexation
India–Pakistan relations
Invasions by India
History of Gujarat